Government Medical College, Jalgaon is a full-fledged tertiary Government medical college in Jalgaon, Maharashtra. The college imparts the degree Bachelor of Medicine and Bachelor of Surgery (MBBS). It is recognised by the Medical Council of India. The hospital associated with the college is one of the largest in Jalgaon district.

Selection to the college is done on the basis of merit through the National Eligibility and Entrance Test. Yearly undergraduate student intake was 100 which was then increased to 150 in 2019.

References

External links 
http://www.gmcjalgaon.org/

Medical colleges in Maharashtra
Universities and colleges in Maharashtra
Educational institutions established in 2018
2018 establishments in Maharashtra
Affiliates of Maharashtra University of Health Sciences